Darrell Edward Sherman (born December 4, 1967) is an American former professional baseball outfielder.

Sherman graduated from Lynwood High School in California and began his college baseball career at Cerritos College. The team had a record of 84–11 in his two years at the school. In 1988, he set school records in runs scored, walks, times on base and stolen bases. Sherman chose to continue his college baseball career at Long Beach State after reneging on a commitment to  play at Cal State Fullerton. In 1989, Sherman helped lead the Dirtbags to the College World Series.

Sherman was selected by the San Diego Padres in the sixth round of the 1989 Major League Baseball draft. In December 1991, Sherman was selected by the Baltimore Orioles in the Rule 5 draft. Sherman was expected to compete for Baltimore's leadoff spot or a fifth outfielder role but was ultimately returned to the Padres before the start of the 1992 season.

Sherman spent the subsequent year in the minors and was promoted to San Diego's 40-man roster for the first time in the November following the 1992 season.

He made his Major League debut on April 8, 1993 against the Pittsburgh Pirates at Three Rivers Stadium. He entered the game in the sixth inning as a pinch hitter for Roger Mason and hit a double off of Bob Walk. Sherman would go on to play in 37 of the team's first 42 games of the season. He played in his 37th and final Major League game on May 22, 1993.

He continued to play professionally until , spending the last seven seasons of his career in the Mexican League.

Prior to the 2008 season, Sherman was named the hitting coach of the Eugene Emeralds. He has also served as a coach for Long Beach Wilson High School and the Tomateros de Culiacán and at Cerritos College.

References

External links

1967 births
Living people
Acereros de Monclova players
African-American baseball players
American expatriate baseball players in Mexico
Baseball players from Los Angeles
Colorado Springs Sky Sox players
Long Beach State Dirtbags baseball players
Las Vegas Stars (baseball) players
Major League Baseball outfielders
Mexican League baseball center fielders
Pericos de Puebla players
Riverside Red Wave players
San Diego Padres players
Spokane Indians players
Tacoma Rainiers players
Vaqueros Laguna players
Wichita Wranglers players
21st-century African-American people
20th-century African-American sportspeople
University of Phoenix alumni
Cerritos Falcons baseball coaches
Cerritos Falcons baseball players
Broncos de Reynosa players
Leones de Yucatán players
Algodoneros de Guasave players